Isaac ben Jacob Benjacob (10 January 1801, Ramygala – 2 July 1863, Vilnius) was a Lithuanian Jewish Maskil,  best known as a bibliographer, author, and publisher. His 17-volume Hebrew Bible included Rashi, Mendelssohn, as well as his own Mikraei Kodesh which "emended" the biblical text and helped spread the Haskalah movement.

Biography and works
Before he learned Russian his parents moved to Vilnius, "and there he received instruction in Hebrew grammar and rabbinical lore".

Benjacob began to write early, and composed short poems and epigrams in pure Biblical Hebrew which are among the best of their kind in Neo-Hebraic literature. For several years he lived in Riga, where he was engaged in business, but always studying and writing in his leisure hours. Later he became a publisher and book-seller and went to Leipzig, where he published his first work, Miktamim ve-Shirim (Epigrams and Songs), which also contains an important essay on epigrammatic composition (Leipzig, 1842). Of the other works which he published there, his corrected edition of R. Bahya ibn Pakuda's Chovot ha-Levavot, with an introduction, a short commentary and a biography of the author, together with notes and fragments of Joseph Kimhi's translation by H. Jellinek, is the most valuable (Leipzig, 1846; Königsberg, 1859, without the introduction).

In 1848 Benjacob returned to Vilnius, and for the next five years he and the poet Abraham Dob Bär Lebensohn were engaged in the publication of the Bible with a German language translation (in Hebrew type) and the new Biurim (Vilnius, 1848–1853, 17 vols.), which did much good as a means of spreading the knowledge of German and a proper understanding of the Hebrew text among the Jews in Russia. When this work was done he brought out his corrected and amended edition of Chaim Joseph David Azulai's Shem ha-Gedolim (Vilnius, 1853; Vienna, 1862), which is still the standard edition of that important work. In 1862 Benjacob announced his intention to begin the publication of popular editions of classical Hebrew works which had become rare or high-priced. He died soon after the appearance of the first volume of Azariah dei Rossi's Meor 'Enayim, with which he started the series (Vilnius, 1863).

Communal activities 
In his later years Benjacob was one of the leaders and representatives of the Jewish community of Vilnius, and took an active part in all communal affairs. In his correspondence with Isaac Bär Lewinsohn, which is partly published in Ha-Kerem (pp. 41–62, Warsaw, 1888), Benjacob throws much light on the condition of the community in the beginning of the second half of the 19th century, and especially on the lamentable condition of the Rabbiner Schule (Rabbinical Seminary) which the government established there and in Jitomir in 1848, and closed in 1873. Benjacob was originally intended to be one of the teachers of the Vilnius Seminary, but never filled the position, and later he became one of the severest critics of that institution. These letters are also interesting on account of the idea they give of the perplexities of the old Maskilim of the Mendelssohnian school in Russia, such as Benjacob, who were being swept aside by the younger generation which had the advantage of a Russian training. He could not speak Russian, and most of the representatives of the community suffered from the same disability, excepting a few merchants who cared little for the fate of the seminary. The older members were at a great disadvantage when pitted against the young students, who could gain whatever they desired from the authorities on account of their correct Russian accent.

Benjacob corresponded with Jewish scholars in Western countries, and was known during his lifetime for his great achievements as a bibliographer, although his monumental work, the Otzar ha-Sefarim, Thesaurus Librorum Hebræorum tam Impressorum quam Manuscriptorum, did not appear until seventeen years after his death (Vilnius, 1880). It was published by his son Jacob, and it contains 17,000 entries of Hebrew printed and manuscript works, with valuable notes by M. Steinschneider. An author-index to the work together with additions was promised (as of 1906) by Steinschneider (Hebr. Bibl. xx. 73; Festschrift, p. vii.). It is the greatest Jewish bibliographical work in the Hebrew language, and is still the standard bibliography of printed books down to 1863.

Besides other minor works and articles published in various Hebrew periodicals and collections, Benjacob also commenced a German-Hebrew dictionary and a Mishnaic-Talmudic dictionary with a German translation, both of which were left unfinished.

Jewish Encyclopedia bibliography 
Julius Fürst, Bibl. Jud. i.103-104 (see also vol. iii, Preface, p. vii);
Brüll's Jahrbücher, v.217;
Monatsschrift, xxx.375-384, 570-572;
Kerem Ḥemed, v.8;
Fuenn, Keneset Yisrael, pp. 597–599;
Ha-Maggid, vii.234;
Ha-Karmel, iii.365, 366.

References

Jewish printing and publishing
Benjacob, Isaac ben Jacob
Benjacob, Isaac ben Jacob
Jews from the Russian Empire
People from Ramygala
Writers from the Russian Empire
People of the Haskalah